Star Wars: The Deckbuilding Game is a deckbuilding game released by Fantasy Flight Games and Asmodee on March 3, 2023.

Reception
The game was generally well received. Charlie Hill of Polygon called it "absolutely brilliant".

Notes and references

2023 works
American board games
Board games introduced in the 2020s
Deck-building card games
Fantasy Flight Games games
Star Wars games